Romerike Folk High School is a freelance folk high school at Jessheim in Akershus. The school has approximately 105 students and is owned by Viken county. Romerike has cultivated one discipline, theater and music. Each year, approximately 40-50 small and large performances, everything from concerts, the whole evening's theater pieces and smaller study projects. The biggest productions play 10-14 performances, usually twice a day. The students live in boarding houses.

The school is 8 km from Oslo Airport, Gardermoen and 2 km from Jessheim city center at Nordbytjernet.

Line subject 
Costume and theatrical makeup
Sound and music
Lighting design
Music and theater
Sets
Theatre

Notable students
Among the school's best known former pupils are several Norwegian actors and artists:
Charlotte Frogner
Dennis Storhøi
Kristopher Schau 
Øivind Blunck 
Nikolaj Frobenius 
Gørild Mauseth
Ane Dahl Torp

Solveig Kloppen
Marian Saastad Ottesen
Sven Nordin
Katrine Moholt
Aksel Hennie
Nicolai Cleve Broch
Trond Espen Seim
Magnus Devold
Anders Baasmo Christiansen
Linn Skåber
Sigrid Bonde Tusvik
Andrea Bræin Hovig
Eva Weel Skram

Bjørn Skagestad

Frank Kjosås

Atle Antonsen

Julia Schacht
Anna Bache-Wiig

Espen Klouman Høiner

Rolf Kristian Larsen

Ida Elise Broch
Birgitte Einarsen
Frithjof Wilborn
Henriette Steenstrup

Jørn Hoel
Pål Sverre Valheim Hagen
Tobias Santelmann
Heine Totland

Anette Hoff

Jørgen Langhelle
Benjamin Helstad

References

External links
 Official website
 Live life on the stage

Schools in Oslo